The Edinburgh Investment Trust plc is an investment trust company dedicated to investing in larger companies. Established in 1889, the trust is listed on the London Stock Exchange and is currently a constituent of the FTSE 250.

References

External links
 

1952 establishments in Scotland
Companies based in Edinburgh
British companies established in 1952
Financial services companies of Scotland
Investment companies of the United Kingdom
Investment trusts of the United Kingdom
Companies listed on the London Stock Exchange